Wühre, also known as Wühre an der Limmat, is an historic pedestrian-only street in the Schipfe district of Zürich, Switzerland.

Hotel zum Storchen, at Weinplatz, is a popular destination for tourists. It is also a departure point for the Limmat river boat.

Storchen

18th-century view

References

Streets in Zürich
Tourist attractions in Zürich